The 1914 United States Senate election in Washington was held on November 3, 1914. Incumbent Republican U.S. Senator Wesley Livsey Jones was re-elected to a second term in office in a three-way race with William Wilson Black and Ole Hanson.

Blanket primary

Candidates

Democratic
William Wilson Black
George F. Cotterill, former Mayor of Seattle
George Turner, former U.S. Senator

Progressive
Jacob Falconer, U.S. Representative at-large and former Speaker of the Washington House of Representatives
Ole Hanson, former State Representative from Seattle (1908–1909)

Republican
Wesley Livsey Jones, incumbent Senator since 1909

Socialist
Adam H. Barth

Results

General election

Candidates
 Adam H. Barth (Socialist)
 Arthur S. Caton (Prohibition)
 William Wilson Black (Democratic)
 Ole Hanson, former State Representative from Seattle (Progressive)
 Wesley Livsey Jones, incumbent U.S. Senator since 1909 (Republican)

Results

See also 
 1914 United States Senate elections

References 

1914
United States Senate
Washington